Mary Louisa White (2 September 1866 – January 1935) was a British composer, pianist, and educator who invented a Letterless Method of musical notation. Her parents were Robert and Louisa Makin White. Mary Louisa, known to her family as "Louie," was the oldest of their four children. She also had a half brother and a half sister from her father's first marriage.

White studied music with John Farmer in London, and gave frequent concerts in London and Paris, including at the Steinway Hall in London. She taught piano at Kensington High School at the turn of the 20th century, and worked at the Girls' Day School Trust with her sisters Jessie and Winnie from 1902 to 1903. At the time, Kensington High School was administered by the Girls' Day School Trust.

White invented the "Letterless Method" of teaching music to beginners. The Letterless Method used metal clefs, rings, disks, and black and white buttons for notes, which children could manipulate for tactile learning.

White's papers, including scrapbooks about her musical career created by her mother and sisters, are archived at University College, London. Her compositions were published by Joseph Williams and Alfred Novello, both of London.

White's compositions include:

Operetta 

Babes in the Woods, opus 42
Beauty and the Beast, opus 41

Orchestra 

Transvaal War Symphony

Piano 

Ballade in G flat
Dances No 1 and 2, Opus 47
Impromptu in E flat, Opus 54 No 2
Minuet in A flat
Nocturne in D flat
Novelette in c minor, Opus 36 No 2
Prelude in D flat
Rhapsody in b flat minor
Short Lyrics
Sketch Book (Gavotte, Hunting Song, March, Minuet, Pastorale, Waltz)
Spinning Wheel
Tiny Tunes for Young Musicians
Two Waltzes
Without Octaves

Vocal 

Hush-a-bye
Jubilate (trio for treble voices)
Maypole
Night's Rhapsody (duet)
Prelude of Spring
School Song for Girls
Secret of the Sea
Sleep, Little Baby, Sleep
Sleep, Sweetly Sleep
Song of the Water Sprite
There be None of Beauty's Daughters
To the River
Twelve Easy Duets
When First I Sang to my Darling

References 

British women composers
1866 births
1935 deaths
British music educators
Musical notation